Kost Human is a South African former rugby league footballer who represented South Africa at the 1995 World Cup, playing in two matches.

References

Living people
South African rugby league players
South Africa national rugby league team players
Rugby league second-rows
Year of birth missing (living people)